Bogoslovo is a rural locality (a selo) in Novoalexandrovskoye Rural Settlement, Suzdalsky District, Vladimir Oblast, Russia. The population was 367 as of 2010. There are 43 streets.

Geography 
Bogoslovo is located 39 km southwest of Suzdal (the district's administrative centre) by road. Zagorye is the nearest rural locality.

References 

Rural localities in Suzdalsky District
Vladimirsky Uyezd